Svein Lilleberg (born 12 November 1958) is a Norwegian cross-country skier.

He contracted polio early, when he was only six months old. To begin with, he was totally paralysed, later regaining most movement, but he has never had use of one foot. He competes in the LW2.

Svein has three sisters, and is married and has four children. They live in Heimdal, Trondheim, near his training base in Granåsen. He was born in Gåslanddalen, Hølonda and is a member of Leik IL.

Results
2006 Winter Paralympics
19th - 5 km
6th - 20 km
5th - 10 km
1998 Winter Paralympics
8th - 15 km
13th - 20 km
12th - 10 km
1994 Winter Paralympics
Silver - 10 km
Silver - 20 km
Silver - 5 km
Gold - relay
Bronze - biathlon
1992 Winter Paralympics
Gull - relay
Silver - 5 km
6th - 20 km
1988 Winter Paralympics
Gold- relay
Gold - 7.5 km
Silver - 15 km
Silver - 5 km
1984 Winter Paralympics
Gold - 10 km
Silver - 5 km
1982 World Championships (Switzerland) 
Gold - 5 km and 10 km

References

1958 births
Paralympic cross-country skiers of Norway
Living people
Paralympic gold medalists for Norway
Paralympic silver medalists for Norway
Paralympic bronze medalists for Norway
Medalists at the 1984 Winter Paralympics
Medalists at the 1988 Winter Paralympics
Medalists at the 1992 Winter Paralympics
Medalists at the 1994 Winter Paralympics
Cross-country skiers at the 1984 Winter Paralympics
Cross-country skiers at the 1988 Winter Paralympics
Cross-country skiers at the 1992 Winter Paralympics
Cross-country skiers at the 1994 Winter Paralympics
Cross-country skiers at the 1998 Winter Paralympics
Cross-country skiers at the 2006 Winter Paralympics
Norwegian male cross-country skiers
Paralympic medalists in cross-country skiing